The Railway Owner (Italian title:Il padrone delle ferriere) is a 1919 Italian silent drama film directed by Eugenio Perego and starring Luigi Serventi, Maria Caserini and Amleto Novelli. It is based on Georges Ohnet's novel Le Maître de Forges.

Cast
 Maria Caserini as Marchesa di Beaulieu 
 Myriam De Gaudi as Sig.na Derblay 
 Isabel De Lizaso
 Pina Menichelli as Clara de Beaulieu 
 Lina Millefleurs as Athenaide Moulinet 
 Amleto Novelli as Filippo Derblay 
 Luigi Serventi as Duca di Bligny

References

Bibliography
 Angela Dalle Vacche. Diva: Defiance and Passion in Early Italian Cinema. University of Texas Press, 2008.

External links 
 

1919 films
1919 drama films
Italian drama films
Italian silent feature films
1910s Italian-language films
Films based on works by Georges Ohnet
Films based on French novels
Films directed by Eugenio Perego
Italian black-and-white films
Silent drama films